Bittoo Boss is a 2012 Hindi comedy film directed by Supavitra Babul. The film features Pulkit Samrat and Amita Pathak in lead roles. It revolves around a man who records videos at weddings.

Synopsis 
The movie is about a guy's journey (Pulkit Samrat) of a wedding videographer from Punjab who is young charming, ingenious calling himself a "Sexy Video Shooter".

Bittoo believes in spreading happiness through the beautiful moments he captures and keep watching for years and smile looking at them.

He falls in love with an educated and strong-headed girl (Amita Pathak) who makes him realize the importance of financial stability and monetary gains in order to gain respect and recognition.

In love and bitten by the one he loves, the smart and righteous cameraman is lured to take a shortcut in order to earn a quick buck and get his life back on track. What follows is a madcap ride.

Cast
 Pulkit Samrat as Bittoo Boss
 Amita Pathak as Mrinalini Pariyar
 Fatima Sana Shaikh as Priya
 Ayush Mehra as Raj
 Rajendra Sethi
 Mohan Kapoor
 Ujjwal Chopra

Controversy

The Central Board of Film Certification had rejected a promo of the film that was scheduled to release in April 2012. The producers are now left with no option but to redesign it and apply to the censor committee all over again. The promo of the film that shows everything through the lenses of a cameraman, has guests at a wedding asking the video camera guy to shoot them as well. Dialogues like 'meri bhi lo' (a shot, in this context) has irked the committee, urging them to reject the entire promo. Supavitra Babul, the debutante director of the film said, "I have been a camera person too. I have got many friends who have been shooting weddings in Delhi. I am well versed with the way people talk. It's all very cute. The film is about a videographer and the way he looks at things. I am surprised that the promo has been rejected for something like this." Kumar Mangat, the producer of the film informed, "The censor committee has completely rejected the song and the promo. It is an old folk song, which we have re-created for our film. But they said that they couldn't give us the certificate. We were ready to change it, beep it or even alter the words but it was a clear 'no' from their end. We were ready to accept cuts but nothing worked. Guess our film does not have big stars or big names to help us." The film was finally released with a "PG" certification, which became the first film in India to get the certificate. PG certificate allows children below 15 years of age to watch the movie in presence of a parent.

Soundtrack

The movie album is composed by Raghav Sachar. Songs like Audi, Kick Lag Gayi and Kaun Kenda has made it very popular and they are hits. It received positive reception. The movie also has a sad number 'Mann jagey sari raat' originally composed by Gajendra Verma, treated by Raghav Sachar, sung by Shahid Malya & penned by Aseem Ahmed Abbasee. The song was well received & was appreciated for its melody & meaningful lyrics.

Critical reception
The film received mixed reviews. Taran Adarsh of Bollywood Hungama gave 1.5 out 5 and says "BITTOO BOSS has a fascinating premise, it appears bona fide as well, but not all concepts expand into entrancing fares. " Martin D'Souza from Glamsham gave it a 2 rating and said "A wedding videographer finally gets his pride of place in Bollywood. But this one is different. He believes in capturing moments that will spread happiness for a lifetime. Madhureeta Mukherjee of The Times of India called the film "a bit too much" and said "This one had the potential to be an entertainer, but turns out to be a 'bit-too' much" Jaidev Hemmady of Movie Talkies gave the film 3 out 5 stars and said, "Weddings, Video And Love! Bittoo Boss has certain sweet moments, viewers who were expecting a Band Baajaa Baaraat after watching the trailers are sure heading for a disappointing experience. " Kunal Guha of Yahoo! rated the film 1 out of 5 stars, saying, "'Bittoo Boss' is a bit too much of what the director believes works. It subscribes to the 'formula' with little thought to application. A bit too bore is more like it.

References

External links 
 

2012 films
2012 comedy films
2010s Hindi-language films
Indian comedy films
Viacom18 Studios films
Hindi-language comedy films
Films scored by Raghav Sachar